Lanalhue Lake is a Chilean lake located in the Arauco Province of Bío Bío Region. The lake is placed in the Nahuelbuta Range above the Lanalhue Fault.

References

External links 

Lakes of Chile
Lakes of Biobío Region